Keith Clifford (born 20 June 1938 in Halifax, West Riding of Yorkshire) is a British actor best known for his role as Billy Hardcastle in Last of the Summer Wine between 1999 and 2006.

Career 
He played Billy Hardcastle on the British sitcom Last of the Summer Wine from 1999 until he decided to leave the series following the 27th series of 2006. (Billy was a comedy character who believed he was a direct descendant of Robin Hood.) He also made guest appearances on Heartbeat, Dalziel and Pascoe and an episode of Cold Feet, and appeared in the TV film Vacuuming Completely Nude in Paradise (2001). In 2007 he played Frank Nicholls in Coronation Street having previously appeared in the series in the guises of different characters; that of Les Battersby's mate, Charlie West, and Harry Norton, a showbiz associate of Alec Gilroy.

He won a Sony Radio Award in 1993 for his portrayal of the Lancashire comedian Frank Randle in the radio play Randle's Scandals.

He has four children, twin sons and two daughters.

Television roles

External links 
 

1938 births
Living people
Actors from Halifax, West Yorkshire
English male television actors
British male comedy actors